Vespers is the evening prayer service in the liturgies of the canonical hours. The word comes from the Greek εσπερινός and its Latin equivalent vesper, meaning "evening." In Lutheranism the traditional form has varied widely with time and place. Martin Luther, in his German Mass and Order of Divine Service (1526') recommended reading the gospel in Latin in schools: "Then let another boy read the same chapter in German for practice, and in case any layman were there to hear...In the same way at Vespers, let them sing the Vesper Psalms as sung hitherto, in Latin, with an antiphon; then a hymn, as there is opportunity." While Latin vespers continued to be said in large churches, many experiments with simplified liturgies were made, including combining the hours of vespers and compline, later taken up in Thomas Cranmer's Anglican evensong. Under the influence of the 20th century Liturgical movement the Alpirsbach circle reintroduced Gregorian chant and spawned the Evangelisch-Lutherische Gebetsbruderschaft, established in 1954, which publishes the Breviarium Lipsiensae or Leipzig Breviary.

Many of Bach's cantatas were first heard in the context of vespers, which are still celebrated Friday evenings in Leipzig's Thomaskirche.

Representative examples
A few examples of Vespers in the Lutheran Church can be found below. The first column is the Office of Vespers as found in the pre-Reformation breviary from the Archdiocese of Magdeburg. The second column provides the Office of Vespers from the Lutheran Cathedral of Havelberg, a suffragan of Magdeburg, as found in the 1589 Vesperale of Matthäus Ludecus, dean of the Havelberg Cathedral. The third column provides Vespers as it was sung in the Lutheran Cathedral of Magdeburg in 1613, precisely one century after the pre-Reformation breviary in the first column. The final column contains the Order of Vespers as found in the 1941 Lutheran Hymnal of the Lutheran Church–Missouri Synod. Along with the outline of the office itself, the various propers for First Vespers of the First Sunday in Advent are also included.

Modern revisions
In the latter half of the twentieth century, in response to the liturgical innovations in the wake of the Second Vatican Council, some Lutheran hymnals, such as the 1978 Lutheran Book of Worship provide a modified form of Vespers in addition to or in place of the traditional form. Generally called Evening Prayer, it begins with a Service of Light in which a lighted candle is carried in procession to the altar while the Phos Hilaron is sung, and the Office Hymn is moved to a new place between the Psalmody and Reading, among other changes.

References

External links
Daily Prayer Books in the History of German and American Lutheranism a survey of breviaries
Kile Smith on his Lutheran Vespers and a preview article
Lutheran Vespers the radio ministry
Bach-cantatas list discussion of Paul McCreesh's reconstructions of historical liturgies

Lutheran liturgy and worship